Gideon Williamson (1898-1981) was a minister, president of Eastern Nazarene College (1936–1944), general president of the Nazarene Young People's Society (1932–1940), and general superintendent in the Church of the Nazarene (1946–1968).

Biography 
William was born February 20, 1898, in New Florence, Missouri, converted and called to preach at an early age in the Church of God (Holiness), and joined the Church of the Nazarene in 1919 when he graduated from John Fletcher College at University Park, Iowa. He pursued further studies at McCormick and Northern Baptist Seminary in Chicago, Illinois. He pastored for 16 years, at the Austin Church in Chicago, the Cleveland First Church of the Nazarene in Ohio, and, after he left the presidency at Eastern Nazarene in Massachusetts, the First Church of the Nazarene in Kansas City, Missouri.

Notes and references

Further reading 
 Librarything: Gideon Brooks Williamson
 Google Books: "Nazarene Preachers Plan Meetings Here", The Evening Independent, 26 February 1949, p. 5

1898 births
1981 deaths
Presidents of Eastern Nazarene College
Nazarene General Superintendents
American Nazarene ministers
People from Montgomery County, Missouri
Northern Baptist Theological Seminary alumni
McCormick Theological Seminary